The Chaetothyriaceae are a family of ascomycetous fungi within the order Chaetothyriales and within the class Eurotiomycetes. A recent (2012) molecular analysis of specimens collected from northern Thailand revealed three new species in the family (Ceramothyrium thailandicum, Chaetothyrium brischofiacola and Phaeosaccardinula ficus).

Genera
 Actinocymbe
 Ainsworthia 
 Almeidaea 
 Ceramothyrium
 Chaetothyrium
 Chaetothyriomyces
 Euceramia
 Microcallis
 Mycostevensonia 
 Phaeosaccardinula
 Treubiomyces
 Yatesula

References

Eurotiomycetes
Ascomycota families